Victoria Schultz (born in Helsinki, Finland), is a photographer and documentary film producer. She attended a school run by nuns in St. Louis, Missouri and went to the University of Helsinki where she received a master's degree in languages. In 1968, she arrived in New York where she obtained another master's from Columbia University School of Journalism. It was there that she focused on film and photography that centered on social rebellion.

Early life 
Growing up Schultz always had a passion for books, comics and magazines that had a combination of images and texts. She also had a passion for movies, which added to her love for strong, visual texts. As she became a documentary filmmaker, she focused on developing factual stories rather than fictional.

Career 
During the seventies, Schultz was a correspondent for the Finnish radio and television in the United States and Latin America. It was during this time that she covered the Nicaraguan Revolution and made the film, Women In Arms, which showed women's powerful and important roles in this uprising.

The general strike had occurred in June 1979 and one month later, was the overthrow of the Somoza family dictatorship where war broke out.

She covered the Nicaraguan revolution as a reporter for WBAI radio and the Finnish Broadcasting Company. She also served as a photographer. Women in Arms portrays the brave role of the Sandinista women in the violent revolution. It won awards in many countries and was shown extensively in the United States at College Campus, the Nicaraguan Film Industry, art theatres including the New York City theatre Bleecker Street Cinema, and the Museum of Modern Art also located in New York but it is still very hard to break into the public television sphere.

In the eighties, Schultz was hired by the United Nations as a film director. Her role was to cover trouble spots around the world and the UN missions. There, she specialized in disarmament issues and was sent to Iraq to search for weapons of mass destruction. Her documentaries on these issues were shown worldwide. She was also a reporter for CNN on post war Kosovo and a senior TV-producer with the UN mission. It was not until the 2000s that she started her career in still photography full-time. Her studio is located in New York's West Village, where she spends half of her time and the other half in Paris.

Victoria Schultz's early work includes many reports and films on social issues. Schultz made award-winning documentaries that were shown worldwide. She produced award-winning reports on post war Kosovo in the Balkans in 1999 for CNN World Report. She also made two films on the search for weapons of mass destruction in Iraq, Hide in Seek in Iraq and Secrets in the Sand.

The two films were broadcast all around world. She also made a documentary called Covering Chiapas. This film was on the Zapatista Movement, where the Zapatistas took over territory in Chiapas, Mexico and marched into the Cathedral in San Cristóbal de las Casas. The film covers and details the coming of this emergence.

Starting in the early 2000s up until now, Schultz works on her passion of still photography. She uses her life experiences as inspiration and creates stories using still photos. She not only takes pictures of others but will include herself in her photos frequently.

Photography 
Schultz's first portfolio, "Stories from Inside the Camera", is a series of photos portraying dramatic moments from her past. The series includes subsections, "Yes and No in my Sister’s Soul," which includes the use of negative film to portray the self, "Shadowboxing in my Father’s Eye," which depicts the F-stops in the camera's lens, and "Not Much Fun to be His Other One," which is a depiction of the struggles between couples.

Her second portfolio, "Animal Tales," includes "Escapees from the Zoo" and "I Married a Crocodile." This portfolio includes child's play with adult meanings. In the first subsection, the series of photos includes the wearing of animal skins to accentuate human urges and anxieties. The second involves a bride and a large, live reptile to represent our partner choices in life.

The third portfolio series, "Social Matters," touches upon world affairs. It includes the series, "Amerika", "Que Viva Mexico!" and "People of the Occupy Movement." Without the constraints of CNN or the UN broadcasting company she feels freer to express her personal thoughts in her photos as well as humor.

Films 
Funded by the two foundations, Ford Foundation and Rockefeller Foundation, and the New York Council of the Arts, Victoria Schultz's directed and produced many documentaries. She directed and produced the film Women in Arms, Hide in Seek in Iraq and Secrets in the Sand, and Cover Chiapas.

References

External links
 DeShazor, B. (Ed.). Women In Arms / Victoria Schultz interviewed by Norma
 2016, from http://www.pwponline.org/event-recap/view/monthly-meeting-6
 Women in Arms / Victoria Schultz [Audio blog interview]. (1981, February). Retrieved

Finnish women photographers
Finnish photographers
Documentary film producers
Finnish expatriates in the United States
Finnish film producers
Finnish women film producers
Living people
People from Helsinki
Year of birth missing (living people)
CNN people
Finnish journalists
Women documentary filmmakers
Finnish women journalists